Aulad Ke Dushman is a 1993 Indian Bollywood film produced and directed by Rajkumar Kohli. It stars Arman Kohli and Ayesha Jhulka in pivotal roles.

Plot 
Rajan K. Choudhry is a wealthy industrialist. He lives in a palatial house with his older brother, and only son, Vikram. Vikram is a womanizer, alcoholic, and late-party goer, who has been handed everything on a silver plater by his dad. His uncle does not appreciate this, and wants Rajan to assert his responsibility as a parent and discipline Vikram, in vain though. Rajan would like Vikram to marry his friend's, Jai Kumar's daughter, Shalu, but Vikram only treats Shalu as a friend.  Just to spite his dad, without knowing that his decisions are going to lead both father and son to a destitute fate, that will change their lives forever.

Cast
Shatrughan Sinha as Rajan Chaudhary 
Raj Babbar as Jai Kumar
Armaan Kohli as Vikram Chaudhary "Vicky"
Ayesha Jhulka as Shalu 
Shakti Kapoor as Dindayal Bhargav
Kader Khan as Ahuja, College Vice-Principal.
Saeed Jaffrey as Rajan's Elder Brother.
Johnny Lever as Johnny
Kanchan as Chanda Bhargav, Dindayal's daughter
Raza Murad
Vikas Anand as Ramlal
Deepak Saraf as Sailesh

Soundtrack
"Aao Tumhe Bataayen" - Abhijeet Bhattacharya, Jolly Mukherjee, Jyoti
"Dil Tujhko De Diya" - Kumar Sanu, Sadhana Sargam
"Main Aa Gaya Hoon" - Amit Kumar
"Main Tera Deewana Hoon" - Alka Yagnik, Kumar Sanu, Sadhana Sargam
"Maine Tumse Pyar Kiya" - Kumar Sanu, Sadhana Sargam
"Tum Bhi Ho Bekhabar" - Kumar Sanu, Sadhana Sargam

References

External links

1990s Hindi-language films
1993 films